Ellis Ferreira and Rick Leach were the defending champions, but Leach did not participate. Ferreira paired with David Rikl but lost in the second round to Arnaud Clément and Sébastien Grosjean.

Jonas Björkman and Todd Woodbridge won the title, defeating Byron Black and David Prinosil 6–1, 5–7, 6–4, 6–4 in the final. It was Woodbridge's 12th Grand Slam men's doubles title  and his first with a partner other than Mark Woodforde, who retired after the 2000 season.

Seeds

Draw

Finals

Top half

Section 1

Section 2

Bottom half

Section 3

Section 4

External links
 2001 Australian Open – Men's draws and results at the International Tennis Federation
 Draw

Men's Doubles
Australian Open (tennis) by year – Men's doubles